Alice Mashingaidze (born 25 April 1968) is a Zimbabwean diplomat. She is Ambassador to Sweden and former Ambassador to Belgium.

Mashingaidze led an Africa Cultural Festival with Makandire Luckson Chezhira Chikutu.

References

External links 
Embassy of Zimbabwe in Stockholm, Sweden
Alice Mashingaidze enviro

1968 births
Living people
Zimbabwean women diplomats
Ambassadors of Zimbabwe to Belgium
Zimbabwean women ambassadors